Marquand Mills is an extinct town in Muskingum County, in the U.S. state of Ohio.

History
The namesake Marquand's Mills consisted of a gristmill, sawmill, and carding mill built in the 19th century on Wills Creek by Charles Marquand. A post office called Marquand was established in 1887, and remained in operation until 1902.

References

Unincorporated communities in Muskingum County, Ohio
1887 establishments in Ohio
Populated places established in 1887
Unincorporated communities in Ohio